The AMK Group is a large mini coach and executive vehicle hire operator based in Liphook, Hampshire. It was founded in 1973 by Kevin and Angela Moger.

It specialises in long-term contract hire for the public sector, run on behalf of local authorities and the National Health Service. 
 
As at October 2013 AMK operate 140 vehicles making it one of the largest mini coach operators in the United Kingdom. It also provides chauffeur driven mini coach hire and operates Dial-A-Bus services in and around Liphook as well as five conventional bus services. 
AMK also provides vehicle servicing and MOT tests.

See also
List of bus operators of the United Kingdom

References

External links

Bus operators in Hampshire
Transport in Hampshire
Transport companies established in 1973
1973 establishments in England